Dathappabhuti was King of Anuradhapura in the 6th century, whose reign lasted from 539 to 540. He succeeded his father Silakala Ambosamanera as King of Anuradhapura and was succeeded by his brother Moggallana II.

See also
 List of Sri Lankan monarchs
 History of Sri Lanka

References

External links
 Kings & Rulers of Sri Lanka
 Codrington's Short History of Ceylon

Monarchs of Anuradhapura
D
D
D